Tomgaran (also Romanized as Tomgarān and Tom Garan; also known as Tamp-e Gīrān, Tūmgīrān, and Tūmpgīrān) is a village in Qaleh Ganj Rural District, in the Central District of Qaleh Ganj County, Kerman Province, Iran. At the 2006 census, its population was 688, in 151 families.

References 

Populated places in Qaleh Ganj County